William Broun may refer to:

William Leroy Broun (1827–1902), President of the Agricultural and Mechanical College of Alabama
Sir William Broun, 9th Baronet (1804–1882), of the Broun baronets
Sir William Broun, 10th Baronet (1848–1918), of the Broun baronets
Sir William Windsor Broun, 13th Baronet (1917–2007), of the Broun baronets

See also
William Brown (disambiguation)
Broun (surname)